Hans Hach Verdugo and Luke Saville were the defending champions but only Hach Verdugo chose to defend his title, partnering Dennis Novikov. Hach Verdugo lost in the first round to Alex Lawson and Jackson Withrow.

Robert Galloway and Roberto Maytín won the title after defeating JC Aragone and Darian King 6–2, 7–5 in the final.

Seeds

Draw

References

External links
 Main draw

Tiburon Challenger - Doubles
2019 Doubles